is a railway station in Sumiyoshi-ku, Osaka, Osaka Prefecture, Japan, operated by the private railway operator Nankai Electric Railway.

Lines
Sawanochō Station is served by the Koya Line, and has the station number "NK53".

Adjacent stations

See also
 List of railway stations in Japan

External links

  

Railway stations in Japan opened in 1942
Railway stations in Osaka Prefecture